The 1926 Saint Louis Billikens football team was an American football team that represented Saint Louis University during the 1926 college football season. In their first season under head coach Robert L. Mathews, the Billikens compiled a 3–6 record and were outscored by a total of 198 to 87. The team played its home games at St. Louis University Athletic Field and Sportsman's Park in St. Louis.

Schedule

References

Saint Louis
Saint Louis Billikens football seasons
Saint Louis Billikens football